Sir James Montagu SL KC (2 February 1666 – 1723), of the Middle Temple, London, was an English lawyer and Whig politician, who sat in the House of Commons at various times between 1695 and 1713. He became a judge and also served as Solicitor General and Attorney General.

Early life
Montagu was the seventh, but fifth surviving son of George Montagu of Horton, Northamptonshire, and his wife Elizabeth Irby, daughter of Sir Anthony Irby and was baptized at Horton on 5 March 1666. His grandfather was Henry Montagu, 1st Earl of Manchester. He was educated at Westminster School and was admitted at Trinity College, Cambridge and Middle Temple in 1683. In 1689 he was  called to the bar from Lincoln's Inn. He was appointed secretary  to the chancellor of Exchequer in April 1694. He married Tufton Wray, daughter of Sir William Wray, 1st Baronet, of Ashby on 6 October 1694.

Career
At the 1695 English general election  Montagu was returned in a contest as Member of Parliament for Tregony. By 1698 he was counsel for  Cambridge University when he was awarded MA and was also appointed chief justice of Ely. He was returned as MP for Beeralston in a by-election on 30 December 1698, but did not stand in the 1701 general elections or at the 1702 English general election.  In 1704 he successfully defended John Tutchin, indicted for a libel published in his periodical, The Observator, and two years later he was leading counsel in the prosecution of Beau Fielding for bigamy in marrying the Duchess of Cleveland. In 1705 he was committed by the House of Commons to the custody of the serjeant-at-arms for having in 1704 demanded a habeas corpus on behalf of the group of Aylesbury men, whom the house had committed to Newgate Prison for bringing actions against the returning officer. Montagu pleaded strongly against the privilege claimed by the Commons. He remained in custody from 26 February to 14 March, when parliament was prorogued and afterwards dissolved. In April 1705 he was knighted at Cambridge, and was made a Q.C. in November of the same year.

Montagu was next returned to Parliament as MP for Carlisle after a contest at the 1705 English general election.  He became solicitor-general and also Bencher of his Inn in 1707. At the 1708 British general election he was returned unopposed as MP for Carlisle. He was appointed attorney-general in September 1708  and was Treasurer of his Inn in 1708 and Library Keeper in 1709. As attorney-general Montagu opened the case in the House of Lords against Henry Sacheverell. At the 1710 British general election he was returned in a contest as MP for Carlisle. With the change of Administration he lost his position as Attorney-general in September 1710. The queen then granted him a pension, which was made the subject of a motion brought before the house in 1711. In this motion, Colonel Gledhill represented it as intended to defray the expenses of Montagu's election at Carlisle, but the charge was disproved. Montagu was dean of the Chapel at Lincoln's Inn in 1711. He did not stand at the 1713 British general election.

Montagu's wife Tufton had died in 1712, and he married, as his second wife, his cousin Elizabeth Montagu, daughter of Robert Montagu, 3rd Earl of Manchester, on 6 October 1713.   He became serjeant-at-law on 26 October 1714, was made a Baron of the Exchequer on 22 November 1714. Also in 1714, he became joint collector of tunnage and poundage, for the Port of London for life.  He was lord commissioner of the great seal (on the resignation of Lord Cowper) from 18 April to 12 May 1718, when Lord Parker became lord chancellor. He became Chief Baron of the Exchequer in May 1722.

Death and legacy
Montagu  died on 1 October 1723 leaving a son and a daughter by his first wife. He was succeeded by his son Charles who sat as a Whig Member of Parliament for St. Albans. His  daughter Elizabeth, married Sir Clement Wearg.  Montagu's brother was Charles Montagu, 1st Earl of Halifax.

References

|-

|-

|-

1666 births
1723 deaths
People from Tregony
People educated at Westminster School, London
Alumni of Trinity College, Cambridge
Members of the Middle Temple
Attorneys General for England and Wales
18th-century English judges
James Montagu
Serjeants-at-law (England)
Solicitors General for England and Wales
Barons of the Exchequer
Chief Barons of the Exchequer
Members of the pre-1707 English Parliament for constituencies in Cornwall
English MPs 1695–1698
English MPs 1698–1700
English MPs 1705–1707
Members of the Parliament of Great Britain for Carlisle
British MPs 1707–1708
British MPs 1708–1710
British MPs 1710–1713
Members of the Parliament of England for Bere Alston